Habib Ahmad was a Pakistani scientist, a Professor of Genetics and vice-chancellor of Islamia College, Peshawar in Peshawar, Pakistan.

Early life, career and awards
Ahmad was born in Matta village in Swat District, Khyber Pakhtunkhwa, Pakistan. He was educated at the Government High School in Matta and passed his matriculation exam in 1975. He graduated from Jahanzeb College in Saidu Sharif in 1981. Then, he received an MSc and MPhil in botany in 1985 and 1991 respectively from the Department of Botany at University of Peshawar, and a PhD from University of the Punjab in 2003. After graduating, he joined Hazara University as a professor in 2005, and has been the vice-chancellor of this university since 28 July 2016.

Ahmad is the author of more than ten books and 217 research papers. He also has more than 30 years experience in teaching, research and development.

Some years ago, he served at the Pakistan Agricultural Research Council in Islamabad, Pakistan. He played a role in the Cytogenetics Program where he contributed to the establishment and strengthening of a Cytogenetics lab.

He has been leading an effort towards an international research project for production of vaccines against Dengue virus.

AWARDS

1:   The Government of Pakistan, Civil Award, Tamgha-e-Imtiaz, 23 March 2011

2:  Best University Teacher Award-2015, HEC, Government of Pakistan

3:   The Government of Khyber Pakhtunkhwa R&D Effort Award-2015

4:   Productive Scientist of Pakistan Award -2016

5:   Productive Scientist of Pakistan Award -2015

6:   Productive Scientist of Pakistan Award -2014

7:   Productive Scientist of Pakistan Award -2013

8:   Productive Scientist of Pakistan Award -2012

9:   Productive Scientist of Pakistan award -2011

10:  Best Performance Award, Hazara University 1st Decade Celebrations-2011

11:  Leading Scientist of the World Award -2011 IBC Cambridge, UK

12:  National Talent Award August–2008

13:  Teacher of the Year UNESCO Award–2007

14:  Best Teacher Award Ministry of Education-2007

15:  Teacher of the Year Medal National Commission for Human Development 2007

16:  Best Researcher of Hazara University-2006

Death
He died on 7 April 2021 after an ailment for several days. His funeral was observed at his hometown Matta, Swat, Pakistan.

References

External links
Habib Ahmad articles on GoogleScholar website

Living people
People from Swat District
Pakistani scientists
Pakistani educators
Pakistani geneticists
Year of birth missing (living people)
Recipients of Tamgha-e-Imtiaz